Sjoerd Bax (born 6 January 1996) is a Dutch cyclist, who currently rides for UCI WorldTeam .

Major results

2014
 1st  Time trial, National Junior Road Championships
 3rd Overall Aubel–Thimister–La Gleize
 10th Road race, UCI Junior Road World Championships
2015
 1st  Young rider classification, Le Triptyque des Monts et Châteaux
2018
 3rd Flèche Ardennaise
 4th Overall Carpathian Couriers Race
 7th Overall Rás Tailteann
 8th Overall Olympia's Tour
2019
 5th Overall Rhône-Alpes Isère Tour
1st  Points classification
1st Stage 2
 5th Overall Ronde de l'Oise
 6th Overall Flèche du Sud
 9th Overall CRO Race
2021
 1st  Overall Alpes Isère Tour
1st  Points classification
1st Stages 3 & 5
 2nd Road race, National Road Championships
 2nd Overall Tour de la Mirabelle
1st Stage 2
2022
 1st Coppa Agostoni
 1st Stage 7 Tour de Langkawi
 4th Overall Tour de Luxembourg
 10th Overall Arctic Race of Norway
2023
 10th Nokere Koerse

References

External links

1996 births
Living people
Dutch male cyclists
Sportspeople from Gorinchem
Cyclists from South Holland
20th-century Dutch people
21st-century Dutch people